Select CITYWALK is a shopping centre located in the Saket District Centre (Sector-6, Pushp Vihar), in Saket, New Delhi. The mall was developed by Select Infrastructure, a joint venture between the Select group and the Aarone Group. It was opened to the public in October 2007.

Location

Select CITYWALK is located in the Saket District Centre, in one of the upcoming middle-class neighborhoods of Saket in South Delhi. It was the first large-scale shopping center to open in South Delhi and was one of the major malls that were planned for the Saket District Centre. The other neighboring malls include the MGF Metropolitan Mall and the DLF Avenue. Malviya Nagar metro station is the nearest metro station for this shopping center.

Features
The Shopping Center is divided into three broad zones: There are eight anchor tenants and 180+ stores representing over 500 major Indian and international brands of clothes.

It also has a number of speciality fine dining restaurants. The mall also houses PVR Cinemas multiplex, which comprises six screens including 2 gold classes and has a total seating capacity of 1,235. In December 2017 it opened Delhi's first IMAX theatre.

There is also a  outdoor open plaza, Sanskriti, for art festivals, fairs, exhibitions, performances, and al fresco dining. The plaza is landscaped extensively in timber, water, stone and steel and has an open–air amphitheater, along with trees and water features.

Gallery

References

External links

Official website

Select Citywalk, New Delhi|S
South Delhi district
Shopping malls established in 2007
2007 establishments in Delhi